Parasetigena is a genus of flies in the family Tachinidae.

Species
P. amurensis (Chao, 1964)
P. bicolor (Chao, 1964)
P. silvestris (Robineau-Desvoidy, 1863)
P. takaoi (Mesnil, 1960)

References

Diptera of Europe
Diptera of Asia
Diptera of North America
Exoristinae
Tachinidae genera
Taxa named by Friedrich Moritz Brauer
Taxa named by Julius von Bergenstamm